Alt Camp is a comarca (county) in Catalonia, Spain.
It is one of the three comarques into which Camp de Tarragona was divided in the comarcal division of 1936.

Geography
Alt Camp is a county in the province of Tarragona in Catalonia, Spain. To the north of the county lies Conca de Barberà, to the northeast lies Anoia, to the east and southeast lie Alt Penedès and Baix Penedès, to the south lies Tarragonès and to the southwest and west lies Baix Camp.

The county is divided into two main topographical areas. The northeastern part is mountainous and is in the Catalan Pre-Coastal Range while the southwestern part is a lowland plain in the Catalan Coastal Depression. The lowland plains of Alt Camp are predominantly used for agriculture. In the valley of the River Gaia, cherries, vines, olives and almonds are grown, and on irrigated land, vegetables, hazelnuts and various fruit trees. The municipality of Bràfim in this valley has a small industrial area. The mountain slopes are covered in maquis, an evergreen Mediterranean scrub with bushes and small trees, including many aromatic shrubs. The olives and grapevines that used to grow on terraces there have been abandoned. Among the scrub there are patches of poplar, elm, white pine, Portuguese oak and holm oak. Frequent wildfires prevent the establishment of permanent forests.

Municipalities 
In 2014, 44,578 people lived in the county: 24,570 of them lived in Valls; 5,131 in Alcover; 2,344 in El Pla de Santa Maria; 1,670 in Vallmoll; 1,264 in Vila-rodona; 1,115 in Cabra del Camp and 1,083 in Puigpelat. The remaining 8,401 inhabitants lived in municipalities with fewer than 1,000 inhabitants.

References

External links

Official comarcal web site 
Informacion about Alt Camp from the Generalitat de Catalunya 

 
Comarques of the Province of Tarragona